The Masked Gang: Iraq is a 2007 Turkish comedy film, directed by Murat Aslan, about an incompetent gang of criminals attempting to capture an oil installation in northern Iraq in order divert the oil to Turkey. It is a sequel to The Masked Gang (2005) and was followed by The Masked Gang: Cyprus (2008).

Plot
In this sequel, the clumsiest comedy heroes of Turkish Cinema are convinced firmly that the rights of Turkey upon the oil supplies of the north Iraq are being ignored. Without further ado, they decide to end this unfairness. The idiotic group succeeds in bringing an Iraqi oil plant under American guard into its control. Guided by their leader Bahattin (Peker Acikalin), the gang members Bubbly Tezcan (Safak Sezer), Private Kamil (Cengiz Kucukayvaz), Clumsy Zeki (Melih Ekener) and Redneck Recep (Atilla Sarihan), manage to take the American soldiers as their hostages, and redirect the pipelines to Turkey. The good mannered gang, however, has difficulties in understanding, why this "clearly legal action" not only captures the attention of the local authorities, but also brings about a strong international crisis between Turkey and the USA. In addition, Tezcan falls in love with the American lieutenant Angel, making the situation as far more complicated.

Cast
 Şafak Sezer as Tezcan
 Peker Açıkalın as Bahattin
 Cengiz Küçükayvaz as Kamil 
 Melih Ekener as Zeki
 Atilla Sarıhan as Laz Recep 
 Erdal Tosun as Peşto
 Cezmi Baskın as Reis
 Durul Bazan as Davi 
 Ali Atıf Bir as the Turkish undersecretary
 Tatyana Tsvikeviç as the American soldier
 Charles Carroll as the American general
 Ceyhun Yılmaz as the taxi driver

Release

Reception
The movie remained number one at the Turkish box office for two weeks tunning and was the third highest grossing Turkish film of 2007 with a total gross of $6,563,123. It remained in the Turkish box-office charts for forty-nine weeks and made a total worldwide gross of $7,717,183.

References

External links
 Official website for the international distributor
 

2007 films
2000s Turkish-language films
2007 comedy films
Films set in Turkey
Turkish comedy films